Possamai is originally regarded as an Italian surname. In Italian it means Possa (rests) mai (never), of which resulted "Never rests".

Possamai may also be a Brazilian surname.

It can specifically refer to several people:

 Agnese Possamai
 Stéphanie Possamaï, a French judoka
 Adam Possamai, Sociologist and Writer 

 Possamai construcciones Uruguayan constructions company